Stordal means "large valley" in Norwegian.  It may refer to:

Places
Stordal, a municipality in Møre og Romsdal county, Norway
Stordal (village), a village in Stordal municipality in Møre og Romsdal county, Norway
Stordal Church, a church in Stordal municipality in Møre og Romsdal county, Norway
Old Stordal Church, a museum/church in Stordal municipality in Møre og Romsdal county, Norway
Stordal, Tromsø, a village in Tromsø municipality, Troms county, Norway

People
Rune Stordal (born 1979), a Norwegian speed skater

See also
Stordalen
Stjørdal